XHJT-FM (branded as La Mejor) is a Regional Mexican radio station that serves Tampico, Tamaulipas.

History 
XHJT received its concession on November 22, 1979.

References

Regional Mexican radio stations
Radio stations in Tampico
MVS Radio